Herius Asinius, of Teate, was the commander of the Marrucini in the Marsic War.  He fell in battle against Gaius Marius in 90 BC.  He may have been the grandfather of Gaius Asinius Pollio, consul in 40 BC, and the ancestor of many, if not all of the members of the gens Asinia who later made their mark on Roman history.

See also
Asinia gens

Notes

1st-century BC Romans
2nd-century BC Romans
89 BC deaths
Ancient Romans killed in action
Ancient Roman soldiers
Herius
Year of birth unknown